The 1904 United States presidential election in Missouri took place on November 8, 1904. Voters chose 18 representatives, or electors to the Electoral College, who voted for president and vice president.

Missouri voted for the Republican nominee, President Theodore Roosevelt, over the Democratic nominee, former Chief Judge of New York Court of Appeals Alton B. Parker. Roosevelt won the state by a narrow margin of 3.91%.

With his victory, Roosevelt became the third Republican presidential candidate to win Missouri, but the first one since Ulysses S. Grant in 1868. In voting for the GOP, Missouri repositioned itself from being associated with the Solid South to being seen as a bellwether swing state throughout the twentieth century. From this election until 2008, Missouri only backed a losing presidential candidate once, in 1956.

Results

Results by county

See also
 United States presidential elections in Missouri

References

Missouri
1904
1904 Missouri elections